Doris Reisinger (née Wagner; b. 1983) is a German philosopher, theologian and author, and former nun.

Early life and abuse 
Reisinger was born Doris Wagner in Ansbach in 1983 and joined the Catholic religious community  (FOS) at an age of 19. In 2008, aged 24, Reisinger alleges she was sexually assaulted by Austrian priest Hermann Geißler, a member of both FOS and the Congregation for the Doctrine of the Faith (CDF). Geißler resigned from the CDF in January 2019 but denied the accusations against him.

Leaving the order and activism 
Reisinger left the order in 2011 and finished her theology studies in 2014. The same year, she published Nicht mehr ich. Die wahre Geschichte einer jungen Ordensfrau, her autobiography, which recounts her experiences as a victim of sexual assault within the Roman Catholic Church. Reisinger critiques that hierarchies of many religions and faith communities, such as the Catholic Church, subordinate individuals. She alleges that these communities would often provide the ideal conditions for assault by men higher up in the ranks. A criminal investigation conducted by the police in Germany and Austria against her alleged rapist did not lead to a conviction. In Germany, authorities closed the case because the priest's conduct did not meet the criteria of a crime, while in Austria the case was closed because the priest convincingly claimed that their relationship was consensual.

Publications 
 Nicht mehr ich. Die wahre Geschichte einer jungen Ordensfrau. (Not me anymore. The true story of a young nun.) Edition a, Wien 2014, .
 with : Spriritueller Missbrauch in der katholischen Kirche. (Spiritual assault within the Catholic Church) Herder, Freiburg 2019, .

See also
Religieuses abusées, l'autre scandale de l'Église

References 

1983 births
Living people
People from Ansbach
Converts to Roman Catholicism from Lutheranism
German Roman Catholic theologians
21st-century German women writers
Sexual abuse victim advocates
21st-century German Roman Catholic nuns
Catholic Church sexual abuse scandals in Germany